Semai is a Austroasiatic language of western Malaysia spoken by about 60,438 Semai people. It is one of the few Aslian languages which are not endangered, and even has 2,000 monolingual speakers.  It is currently spoken by 3 main groups; the Northern Semai, Central Semai and the Southern Semai.

Phonology 
One notable aspect of Semai phonology is its highly irregular pattern of expressive reduplication, showing discontiguous copying from just the edges of the reduplicant's base, thus forming a minor syllable.

Vowels

Consonants

Examples 
Examples of words in Semai include the following:

In popular culture 
 Asli (2017), a film directed by David Liew, is about a bi-racial girl on a road to discover her cultural heritage, is the first film to use the Semai language in 50% of its dialogue.

References

Further reading 

Diffloth, Gerard.  1976a.  Minor-Syllable Vocalism in Senoic Languages.  In Philip N. Lenner, Laurence C. Thompson, and Stanley Starosta (eds.), Austroasiatic Studies, Part I, 229–247.  Honolulu: The University of Hawaii Press.
Diffloth, Gerard.  1976b.  Expressives in Semai.  In Philip N. Lenner, Laurence C. Thompson, and Stanley Starosta (eds.), Austroasiatic Studies, Part I, 249–264.  Honolulu: The University of Hawaii Press.
Hendricks, Sean.  2001.  Bare-Consonant Reduplication Without Prosodic Templates: Expressive Reduplication in Semai.  Journal of East Asian Linguistics 10: 287–306.
Phillips, Timothy C. 2013. Linguistic Comparison of Semai Dialects. SIL Electronic Survey Reports 2013-010: 1–111.

External links 

 http://projekt.ht.lu.se/rwaai RWAAI (Repository and Workspace for Austroasiatic Intangible Heritage)
 http://hdl.handle.net/10050/00-0000-0000-0003-66BF-5@view Semai in RWAAI Digital Archive
 Semai dictionary of SIL International – online version accessible from Webonary.org

Languages of Malaysia
Aslian languages